The PCL family of companies is a group of independent general contracting construction companies in Canada, the United States, Australia and the Caribbean. PCL has headquarters in Edmonton, Alberta, Canada, with the United States head office in Denver, Colorado.

History
PCL began operations in 1906 as Martin and Poole Construction, founded by James Martin and Ernest Edward Poole (October 18, 1883 – March 12, 1964) in Stoughton, Saskatchewan.  Poole and Martin both returned to their homes on Prince Edward Island for the winter of 1906–07, and Martin decided to remain and retire.  Poole continued the company upon his return to Saskatchewan in spring 1907, and he changed the company name to E.E. Poole Contractors.

In 1913, Poole renamed the company to Poole Construction Company Limited. In 1932, the company was moved to its current corporate headquarters in Edmonton, Alberta.

In 1975, the company opened its U.S. head office in Denver, Colorado. Ernest Poole's sons, John Edward (1917–2007) and George Ernest (1921–1997), sold the company in 1977 to their 25 senior managers and Great West Life. Poole Construction Company Limited changed its name to PCL Construction Ltd. in 1979.

Controversies 
In March 2018, the company settled a $10.53 million lawsuit stemming from an incident in July 2017 which resulted in the loss of electrical power to more than 10,000 customers on Hatteras and Ocracoke Island. While performing construction on Bonner Bridge, a steel casing was driven into an underground transmission cable, requiring a mandatory evacuation for visitors and resulting in much of the two islands being without power for 9 days.

References

External links
 

Construction and civil engineering companies of the United States
Construction and civil engineering companies of Canada
Companies based in Edmonton
1906 establishments in Alberta
Employee-owned companies of Canada